Zarrinabad, also Romanized as Zarrīnābād and Zarinabad) is a city in the Central District of Ijrud County, Zanjan province, Iran, and serves as capital of the county. At the 2006 census, its population was 1,944 in 512 households. The following census in 2011 counted 2,471 people in 642 households. The latest census in 2016 showed a population of 2,374 people in 701 households.

References 

Ijrud County

Cities in Zanjan Province

Populated places in Zanjan Province

Populated places in Ijrud County